The 1956 Virginia Cavaliers football team represented the University of Virginia during the 1956 NCAA University Division football season. The Cavaliers were led by first-year head coach Ben Martin and played their home games at Scott Stadium in Charlottesville, Virginia. They competed as members of the Atlantic Coast Conference, finishing in last. Their win against Wake Forest was Virginia's first ACC victory as members of the conference, coming in their third year of membership.

Schedule

References

Virginia
Virginia Cavaliers football seasons
Virginia Cavaliers football